Okounov is a municipality and village in Chomutov District in the Ústí nad Labem Region of the Czech Republic. It has about 400 inhabitants.

Administrative parts
Villages and hamlets of Kotvina, Krupice and Oslovice are administrative parts of Okounov.

References

Villages in Chomutov District